Emerson Raymundo Santos (born 5 April 1995), known as Emerson Santos or simply Emerson, is a Brazilian footballer who plays as a central defender for Atlético Goianiense, on loan from Kashiwa Reysol.

Club career
Born in Itaboraí, Rio de Janeiro, Emerson represented Botafogo as a youth. He made his senior debut on 30 April 2015, starting in a 2–1 Copa do Brasil away win against Capivariano.

On 7 May 2015 Emerson was definitely promoted to the first team in Série B, but contributed with only one league match during the campaign, which ended in promotion as champions. On 8 December, he renewed his contract until the end of 2017.

Emerson became a regular starter in 2016, and scored his first senior goal on 28 February of that year, netting the equalizer through a direct free kick in a 1–1 draw at Vasco da Gama for the Campeonato Carioca championship. On 22 May he made his Série A debut, starting in a 1–1 away draw against Sport.

On August 16, 2017 he signed for Palmeiras.

Honours

Club
Botafogo
Campeonato Brasileiro Série B: 2015

Palmeiras
Campeonato Paulista: 2020
Copa do Brasil:  2020
Copa Libertadores: 2020

References

External links

1995 births
Living people
Sportspeople from Rio de Janeiro (state)
Association football defenders
Brazilian footballers
Campeonato Brasileiro Série A players
Campeonato Brasileiro Série B players
Botafogo de Futebol e Regatas players
Sociedade Esportiva Palmeiras players
Sport Club Internacional players
Kashiwa Reysol players
Atlético Clube Goianiense players
Brazilian expatriate sportspeople in Japan
Expatriate footballers in Japan
J1 League players
People from Itaboraí